The I-10 Bonnet Carré Spillway Bridge is a twin concrete trestle bridge in the U.S. state of Louisiana.

The bridge carries Interstate 10 over the Bonnet Carré Spillway, Lake Pontchartrain, and LaBranche Wetlands in St. Charles Parish and a portion of St. John the Baptist and Jefferson Parishes. The bridge opened in 1972.

See also
List of bridges in the United States
List of longest bridges in the world

References

External links
LA DOTD website

Buildings and structures in St. Charles Parish, Louisiana
Tourist attractions in St. Charles Parish, Louisiana
Transportation in St. Charles Parish, Louisiana
Buildings and structures in St. John the Baptist Parish, Louisiana
Transportation in St. John the Baptist Parish, Louisiana
Road bridges in Louisiana
Interstate 10
Bridges on the Interstate Highway System
Concrete bridges in the United States
Trestle bridges in the United States
1972 establishments in Louisiana
Bridges completed in 1972